SS Joel Palmer was a Liberty Ship used in World War II by the U.S. to transport troops, supplies, munitions, weapons mostly in Australia, Philippines, Papua New Guinea, and Indonesia.  The ship was named after Oregon Pioneer Joel Palmer (1810–1881). Joel Palmer was operated under a charter with the Maritime Commission and War Shipping Administration by the American Mail Line.

She was built in 1943 at the Oregon Shipbuilding Corporation in the St. Johns neighborhood of Portland, Oregon. She made at least 12 port calls from August 1943 to May 1945.

References 

Liberty ships
Ships built in Portland, Oregon
Aircraft transports of the United States Navy
1943 ships